"Gained the World" is the second single released from Morcheeba's sixth studio album Dive Deep. It was digitally released on 28 April 2008, while it was physically released in the United Kingdom on 26 May 2008. The song features "bittersweet" vocals of French singer Manda Zamolo.

Composition
The album producer Paul Godfrey posted his opinion about song on Morcheeba's official website, writing:

Critical reception
IndieLondon noted that "Gained the World" is "a melody-laden beauty that introduces the listener to the soothing tones of French vocalist Manda for the first time."

Music video
The animated music video was directed by Joel Trussell, an American artist who also made the video for "Enjoy the Ride".

Track listing
The single was released as an EP containing two remixes and "Priceless" as a B-side that was not included on the album. "Priceless" features performance by Bootie Brown of Pharcyde, the distinctive voice of Merry Clayton on backing vocals and lead vocals of Judie Tzuke.

 "Gained the World" – 2:56
 "Priceless" – 5:52   
 "Gained the World" (Serious Music Remix) – 2:59 
 "Enjoy the Ride" (Jason Bentley Mix) – 5:57

References

External links
 Morcheeba - Dive Deep - Official Website
 MySpaceTV: "Gained the World" video
 Manda Zamolo Official Website

2008 singles
Morcheeba songs
2008 songs
PIAS Recordings singles
The Echo Label singles